Belozersky is a Russian surname derived from the princely title, Prince of Beloozero, Prince Belozersky. Notable people with the surname include:

Andrey Belozersky (1905–1972), Soviet Russian biologist

See also
Belozersky (disambiguation)

Russian-language surnames